The Seventh Federal Electoral District of Chiapas (VII Distrito Electoral Federal de Chiapas) is one of the 300 Electoral Districts into which Mexico is divided for the purpose of elections to the federal Chamber of Deputies and one of 12 such districts in the state of Chiapas.

It elects one deputy to the lower house of Congress for each three-year legislative period, by means of the first past the post system.

District territory
The Seventh District of Chiapas is located in the Soconusco region on the state's Pacific coast.
It comprises the municipalities of
Acacoyagua, Acapetahua, Arriaga, Escuintla, Mapastepec, Pijijiapan, Tonalá and Villa Comaltitlán.

The district's head town (cabecera distrital), where results from individual polling stations are gathered together and collated, is the city of Tonalá, Chiapas.

Previous districting schemes

1996–2005 district
Between 1996 and 2005, the Seventh  District was still in Soconusco region, but had a slightly different configuration. It covered:
Arriaga, Pijijiapan and Tonalá, as at present, plus:
Cintalapa and Jiquipilas, 

The Seventh District of Chiapas was created in 1977. Prior to that year, Chiapas only had six federal electoral districts. The Seventh District elected its first deputy, to the 51st Congress, in 1979.

Deputies returned to Congress from this district

LI Legislature
1979–1982:  Antonio Cueto Citalán (PRI)
LII Legislature
1982–1985:  Sami David David (PRI)
LIII Legislature
1985–1988:
LIV Legislature
1988–1991:  Neftalí Rojas Hidalgo (PRI)
LV Legislature
1991–1994:
LVI Legislature
1994–1997:  Gabriel Aguiar Ortega (PRI)
LVII Legislature
1997–2000:  Juan Oscar Trinidad Palacios (PRI)
LVIII Legislature
2000–2003:  Patricia Aguilar García (PRI)
LIX Legislature
2003–2006:  Francisco Grajales Palacios (PRI)
LX Legislature
2006–2009:  Fernel Gálvez Rodríguez (PRD)

References and notes 

Federal electoral districts of Mexico
Government of Chiapas